Mohan Kumar P.P. also known as Vennala Mohan is a multi-faceted artist with numerous contributions in Malayalam as novelist, short story writer, script writer, lyricist, poet, actor and dubbing artist. He has also anchored many programs in All India Radio and Doordarshan. He has  completed Diploma in Journalism and has been working with several leading media houses in Kerala and Lakshadweep.

Early life

Vennala Mohan was born at Vennala in Ernakulam district Kerala on 18 May 1961. His father Prabhakara kurup was a businessman and mother Ambujakhy kunjamma was taking care of the house hold. Mohan had his education at Government High School, Vennala and later at Maharaja's College, Ernakulam. Mohan started writing story at the age of 13, with Oru nunayude katha(Story of a lie) in the Balalokam magazine in 1974 and Dukham (Sorrow) was published in Talir magazine in 1975.

Contributions

Books

Television

Links with Malayalam magazines

Paper Presentation

Awards

 2022 - K Radhakrishanan Sahitya Puraskaram  
 2022 - Kavyayanam State Genius Award
 2020 - Spearheading a New Literary Form - Vennala Mohan features in Best-of-India Records (BIR)  
 2012 – Atlas Kairali Bala Sahitya Award
 2012 – Atymayanangalude Khasak Award For Novelette
 2008 – Jaycey Foundation Award For Novel
 1999 – Solomon Joseph Award For Short Story

References

1961 births
Living people
Indian writers
People from Ernakulam district
Malayalam-language writers
Novelists from Kerala